Radin Jablanić (1330 — 1387) was a powerful Bosnian nobleman, the oldest known member of the Pavlović noble family and the father of Pavle Radinović, who rose to prominence during the reign of Tvrtko I. His power and wealth made him one of the most powerful magnates and his family one of the most influential in Bosnian Banate and later the Kingdom of Bosnia, ruling the area around between Drina and Vrhbosna, and between Krivaja and Prača.

Even as a boy, Radin traveled with his father around the family estates, followed the completion of the construction of the town of Borač, and worked with his father on plans for the construction of other towers and city walls under the family's administration. Radin's father's name was Jablan, from whom he got the surname Jablanić.

As early as 1355, he took over the management of the family estates, when Bosnia was ruled by Ban Stjepan Tvrtko I Kotromanić. In thirty years at the head of the family, he succeeded to increase the family estates many times over. Thus, in 1373, he expanded his possessions to the entire left bank of the Drina river up to Srebrenica, in the north to Birač and northwest to town of Olovo, in the south to Foča, thus holding the greater part of the eastern borderlands of Banate of Bosnia. In 1377, he helped ban Tvrtko I to take over Trebinje and the Dubrovnik hinterland of Konavle, for which he was awarded Trebinje and the wider area by the ban.

References

Bibliography

1330 births
1387 deaths
p
p
Banate of Bosnia
Kingdom of Bosnia
Grand Knyazs of Bosnia
Bosnian magnates